Große Freiheit Nr. 7 (English: Great Freedom No. 7) is a 1944 German musical drama film directed by Helmut Käutner. It was named after Große Freiheit (grand freedom), a street next to Hamburg's Reeperbahn road in the St. Pauli red light district.

The film is also known as Port of Freedom in the United Kingdom.

It was shot at the Tempelhof and Babelsberg Studios in Berlin, and on location in Hamburg and Prague.

Plot summary 
The film tells the story of the blond "singing sailor" Hannes Kröger (played by Hans Albers) who works in a St. Pauli club - address: Große Freiheit 7 - and falls in love with a girl played by Ilse Werner. But she prefers his rival Willem (Hans Söhnker) and Hannes returns to the sea.

Cast 
Hans Albers as Hannes Kroeger
Ilse Werner as Gisa Häuptlein
Hans Söhnker as Willem
Hilde Hildebrand as Anita
Gustav Knuth as Fiete
Günther Lüders as Jens
Ilse Fürstenberg as Gisa's mother
Ethel Reschke as Margot
Erna Sellmer as Frau Kaasbohm
Kurt Wieschala as Jan
Helmut Käutner as Karl
Richard Nicolas as Admiral
Maria Besendahl as Frau Boergel
Justus Ott as Herr Wellenkamp
Gottlieb Reeck as Herr Puhlmann
Thea Thiele as Consul's wife
Alfred Braun as Rundfunkreporter
Rudolf Koch-Riehl as Master of ceremonies
Karl-Heinz Peters as Postman
Erwin Loraino as Sailor

Soundtrack 
 Hans Albers – "Auf der Reeperbahn nachts um halb eins" - On the Reeperbahn at Half Past Midnight (song)
 Hilde Hildebrand – "Beim ersten Mal, da tut's noch weh"
 Hans Albers – "La Paloma"
 Hans Albers – "Nein, ich kann Dich nicht vergessen"
 Hans Albers – "Schön ist die Liebe im Hafen"
 Hans Albers – "Was kann es denn schöneres geben"
 Hans Albers – "Wenn ein Seemann mal nach Hamburg kommt"

Production 
Due to the threat of Allied bombing raids to Hamburg Harbour and to the Ufa studios in Berlin's  Neubabelsberg and Tempelhof when it was made in 1943 (May to November), most of the movie was shot in Prague's Barrandov Studios by Helmut Käutner, as the first Agfa colorfilm by Terra. For a scene with a boat trip in Hamburg harbour warships had to be covered up.

Reception 

Nazi propaganda minister Joseph Goebbels was dissatisfied, and demanded many changes to make the film more "German", for instance by renaming the lead role from Jonny (as in Albers' earlier hit song "Good bye, Jonny") to Hannes. After a year of editing, the movie was banned anyway in Nazi Germany on 12 December 1944, and was only shown outside of the Großdeutsches Reich proper, with the premiere on 15 December 1944 in occupied Prague (then a Reichsprotektorat). It remained banned in Nazi Germany, opening on 6 September 1945 in Berlin's Filmbühne Wien after the Allied victory.

References 

 Rüdiger Bloemeke: "La Paloma – Das Jahrhundertlied". 158 Seiten, über 30 Seiten Farb- und Schwarzweiß-Abbildungen. Voodoo-Verlag, Hamburg 2005

External links 

 Große Freiheit Nr. 7 Full movie at the Deutsche Filmothek
Große Freiheit Nr. 7
http://www.der-blonde-hans.de/albers10a.htm 

1944 films
1944 romantic drama films
German musical drama films
German romantic musical films
Films of Nazi Germany
1940s German-language films
Films directed by Helmut Käutner
Films set in Hamburg
1940s musical drama films
Seafaring films
Films shot at Tempelhof Studios
Films shot at Babelsberg Studios
Terra Film films
1940s romantic musical films